The Hoard is a 2018 Canadian comedy horror film written, produced, edited, and directed by Jesse Thomas Cook and Matt Wiele. The movie was released in Owen Sound, Canada on June 15, 2018.

Plot
The adventures and struggles of a production team trying to produce the pilot for a TV reality show called "Extremely Haunted Hoarders".

Cast
 Lisa Solberg as Sheila Smyth
 Tony Burgess as Dr. Lance Ebe
 Barry More as Murph Evans
 Ry Barrett as Caleb Black
 Elma Begovic as Chloe Black

Release

Reception
Anton Bitel from the British magazine SciFiNow called the movie "very, very funny", stating that "the screenplay from Burgess, Cook, and Wiele finding just the right place between smart and dumb, and turning garbage into pure gold". Kat Hughes writing for "The Hollywood News" argued that the film starts well, but finishes badly, saying: "The Hoard starts well, but ultimately gets lost in silliness. If you’re a fan of a certain brand of comedy then you’ll have the time of your life, otherwise you may find the whole affair rather unsavoury." Jennie Kermode from the website "Eye for Film" didn't like the film at all, giving it 2.5 stars out of 5 and writing: "The Hoard is, in many ways, a victim of its own success. It captures the in-your-face style of hoarding programmes perfectly but it's 96 minutes long with no advert breaks, and watching it quickly becomes exhausting."

References

External links
 
 

2018 films
2018 comedy horror films
Canadian comedy horror films
English-language Canadian films
2010s English-language films
2010s Canadian films